General Fischer may refer to:

Adolf Fischer (officer) (1893–1947), German Wehrmacht major general
Gotthard Fischer (1891–1969), German Wehrmacht lieutenant general
Hermann Fischer (general) (1894–1968), German Wehrmacht lieutenant general
Jean Chrétien Fischer (1713–1762), German-born French Army general
Wolfgang Fischer (1888–1943), German Wehrmacht general

See also
General Fisher (disambiguation)